D. pentaphylla may refer to:

 Dalechampia pentaphylla, a Brazilian plant
 Dioscorea pentaphylla, a prickly vine